Hellinsia alfaroi is a moth of the family Pterophoridae. It is found in Ecuador.

The wingspan is 17 mm. The forewings are pale brown-ochreous and the markings are dark brown. The hindwings are dark grey-brown, ochreous tinged in the basal part of the third lobe. The fringes are dark grey-brown. Adults are on wing in April, at an altitude of 1,100 meters.

Etymology
The species is named after Eloy Alfaro, president of Ecuador, who was assassinated in 1912.

References

Moths described in 2011
alfaroi
Moths of South America